The 1998–99 season is the third in the history of the Glasgow Warriors as a professional side. During this season the young professional side competed as Glasgow Caledonians.

This season saw Glasgow Caledonians compete in the competitions: the Scottish Inter-District Championship and the European Champions Cup, the Heineken Cup - as well as the Welsh Rugby Union's Challenge Cup.

Season Overview

This proved to be one of the most turbulent years in the club's existence. The SRU decided to reduce the number of professional teams in Scotland from 4 to 2. Only Glasgow and Edinburgh now remained standing; with Glasgow taking over the Caledonia district – and Edinburgh taking over the Borders district. The fall-out from this caused many professional players to lose their jobs and created managerial problems at Glasgow.

Meanwhile, behind the scenes there were negotiations on trying to get a suitable league structure in place for the two remaining Scottish professional sides.

Merger

The SRU announced on 26 March 1998 that they would be halving the number of teams who compete in Europe.

The move stunned almost everyone in Scottish rugby; including Jim Telfer who had little time to prepare a defence of the four districts. Telfer thought about resigning over the move.

What was even more surprising was the two sides ear-marked for closure. Caledonia Reds were the current Scottish Inter-District Championship holders. Border Reivers were based in Scotland's rugby heartland.

The SRU claimed the move was a rugby decision. The fact that last season's top two sides Caledonia Reds and Glasgow Warriors were being merged into one however made most doubt this.

Some clubs - resentful of the districts in Europe – celebrated the decision and saw it as the death-knell of the Scottish districts. The Hawick president Robert Christie said: "We are strongly in favour of this new development. We want clubs to get back to having a meaningful season." Former Grand Slam winning captain - and part of the 'Gang of Four' arguing against districts - David Sole stated: "This proves yet again that to put the focus on districts was an ill-conceived and ill-planned idea which wasn't thought through".

It soon became clear that finance was at the heart of the decision. The Herald ran this story over the closures: "There is absolutely no doubt in my mind that the prime reason for the SRU cutting their squad from 120 to 60 is to cut costs and appease the clubs" and "they have slashed the so-called budget by dumping players and they'll save nearly a million quid."

It was later announced that 43 players had been cut from the professional clubs. For the Glasgow side it meant that it lost about half its squad to make way for around half of the Caledonia squad.

The Glasgow District now consumed the Caledonia District - and the Edinburgh District took in the Borders District. The new districts were deemed 'Super-districts'. This was an unfortunate name as, at least initially, their play did not merit the term and the reduction of the districts hindered player progression around the country.

New coach

It was felt that Robertson struggled with trying to bond the newly merged squad together. For the first time then, the SRU appointed a top name Scottish coach for the professional Glasgow side.

Richie Dixon was the former Scotland boss from 1995 to 1998, with a success rate (50%) at Scotland national level higher than Ian McGeechan (42%) and just slightly below that of Jim Telfer (53.8%). Dixon had quit the national job after Scotland lost a Five Nations warm up match to the fast improving Italian team but it was thought, with his experience, he was best placed to bring the district players together.

Perhaps more importantly to Glasgow, he was a former Glasgow District player and captain in the amateur days of the club. As a player, he won the Scottish Inter-District Championship outright for Glasgow District in 1974. He took over the district as coach in 1983 and won the Championship as coach for Glasgow in 1989–90 in an unbeaten season, also beating the touring Fiji national rugby union team. There was no doubting his Glasgow pedigree. He took over Glasgow Caledonians in January 1999.

League structure

With only 2 Scottish teams the Scottish Inter-District Championship could not continue in its current form. The restricted 3 game format was kept; however this was deemed a 'tri-series': essentially a best-of-three tournament to determine the winner.

It was felt that only playing 3 games against the same opposition would not help either Glasgow or Edinburgh in their European campaigns.

To try and increase the level of competition available, friendlies were sought as a short term fix while negotiations continued with other Rugby Unions. Pleasingly for the SRU, the Welsh Rugby Union and the Irish Rugby Football Union were meandering their way to a similar conclusion about increasing competitiveness for their own sides. The Scottish district sides faced up to the Irish provinces as part of the friendlies organised for the pre-season. In competitive matches, Glasgow and Edinburgh were also invited sides to take part in this season's Welsh Rugby Union's Challenge Cup. The SRU also organised pre-season friendlies against London Scottish - a member of the Scottish Rugby Union - and their London neighbour Richmond for Glasgow. It also organised friendlies against touring international teams for the clubs.

The Irish Rugby Football Union was against joining a British and Irish league. Thoughts in Wales turned to England. Initially it was thought that the English Rugby Union might be interested in a British league. However their proposals to the Welsh Rugby Union - that 5 Welsh clubs join a two tier English league - showed English contempt for the 'British' plan. The English model was flatly rejected by the WRU. The Wales coach Graham Henry said "It was right to reject this paltry offer. What was proposed wasn't British, just a few Welsh clubs in a predominantly English league which would have been no good to anyone".

The SRU felt the creation of a Celtic League for the Scottish, Irish and Welsh sides was the best way forward. This however didn't happen immediately but the fledgling success of the Scottish sides in the WRU Challenge Cup engendered good relations between Scotland and Wales and paved the way for a Welsh-Scottish League.

Team

Coaches

Head coach:  Keith Robertson to January 1999;  Richie Dixon from January 1999.
Assistant coach:  Gordon Macpherson
Assistant coach:  Rob Moffat from January 1999.

Squad

Academy players

Glasgow District Rugby Union once again sent a Glasgow Thistles squad to New Zealand for their development. The young players trained and played in New Zealand in the summer of 1999.

Player statistics
During the 1998–99 season, Glasgow have used 35 different players in competitive games. The table below shows the number of appearances and points scored by each player.

Staff movements

Coaches

Personnel In

 Richie Dixon from  London Scottish

Personnel Out

 Keith Robertson to  Scotland Under 21 (Asst).

Player movements

Academy promotions

Glasgow has no formal academy structure as yet, however Glasgow District Rugby Union is continuing to send its most promising youngsters - the Glasgow Thistles - to New Zealand for summer training.

These two players from the 1998 Glasgow Thistles team to go to New Zealand were used as part of the Glasgow squad, though they did not play. They continued to play for their amateur sides when not in use for Glasgow.

 Rory Kerr from  West of Scotland F.C.
 Rory Couper from  Ardrossan Academicals RFC

Player transfers

In

 Luke Smith from  Border Bulldogs
 Graeme Beveridge from  Edinburgh Rugby
 Shaun Longstaff from  Caledonia Reds
 Kevin McKenzie from  Caledonia Reds
 John Leslie from  Highlanders
 Chris Paterson from  Gala RFC
 Stuart Grimes from  Caledonia Reds
 Rob Wainwright from  Caledonia Reds
 Jason White from  Caledonia Reds
 Gordon Simpson from  Caledonia Reds
 Derrick Patterson from  Caledonia Reds
 Stewart Campbell from  Caledonia Reds
 Tom Smith from  Caledonia Reds
 Gareth Flockhart from  Caledonia Reds
 Gavin Scott from  Caledonia Reds
 Willie Anderson from  Caledonia Reds
 Martin Waite from  Caledonia Reds
 James McLaren from  Caledonia Reds
 Rowen Shepherd from  Caledonia Reds
 John Manson from  Caledonia Reds
 Jon Petrie from  Dundee HSFP
 Murray Craig from  Edinburgh Rugby

Out

 Shade Munro retired
 Fergus Wallace to  Glasgow Hawks
 Mike Beckham to  Leeds Tykes
 David Jamieson to  Stirling County RFC
 Danny Porte to  Watsonians RFC
 Charles Afuakwah to  Glasgow Hawks
 Gerry Hawkes to  Glasgow Hawks
 Scott Hutton to  Glasgow Hawks
 Stephen Begley to  Glasgow Hawks
 Malcolm Norval to  Stirling County RFC
 Andrew Ness to  Glasgow Hawks
 Gavin Fraser to   Watsonians RFC
 Craig Sangster to   Blackheath
 Danny Ablett to  Glasgow Hawks
 David McLeish retired
 Jamie Weston to   Watsonians RFC
 Iain Sinclair to   Edinburgh Reivers
 James McLaren to  CS Bourgoin
 Alan Perrie to  Glasgow Hawks
 Murray Craig to  Exeter Chiefs

Competitions

Pre-season and friendlies

Match 1

Glasgow Caledonians:G Metcalfe; D Stark, C Simmers, I Jardine, J Craig; T Hayes, D Patterson; T Smith, K McKenzie, A Kittle, S Campbell, G Perrett, G Flockhart, M Waite, G Simpson. Replacements (all used) - F Stott, M Craig, R Kerr, G McIlwham, W Anderson, G Scott, J Shaw, J Manson.

Richmond: M Pini; N Waine, T Whitford, M Deane, S Brown; A Davies, A Moore; D McFarland, A Cuthbert, J Davies, B Cusack, C Gillies, C Palmer, B Clarke, A Vander. Replacements (all used) - B Shelbourne, D Chapman, M Fitzgerald, M Dixon, J Hamilton-Smith, L Cabannes, R Hutton.

Match 2

London Scottish: I McAusland, K Milligan (J Turnbull 70), R Davies, J Bonney, I McIntyre (E Ramage 42), J Cameron (S Binns 30), G Easterby, P Johnstone (R Bijl 65), D Cummins, P Burnell (C Johnstone 49), E Jones, M Watson( M McAtamney 48), S Fenn (T Davies 38), C Tarbuck (G Manson-Bishop 59), R Hunter.

Glasgow Caledonians: G Metcalfe, S Longstaff (A Bulloch 21), R Shepherd, I Jardine, D Stark, T Hayes (C Simmers 30), F Stott, T Smith (G McIlwham 65), K McKenzie, W Anderson (A Kittle 56), S Grimes, S Campbell, J White, G Simpson, G MacKay (G Flockhart 56).

Match 3

Ulster: S. Mason; J. Davis, S. McDowell (S. Coulter), M. McCall, J. Cunningham; D. Humphries, A. Matchett; J.Fitzpatrick, A. Clarke (R. Weir), G. Leslie (R. Irwin), M. Rea (M.Blair), G. Longwell, A. Ward, A. McWhirter (C. McCarey )

Glasgow Caledonians: R. Shepherd (A. Collins); A. Bulloch, C.Simmers, I. Jardine, D. Stark; C. Paterson, D. Patterson (F. Stott); G. McIlwham, C. Docherty (T. Smith), A. Kittle (W. Anderson), S. Campbell, G. Perrett (S. Grimes), J. White, G.Flockhart (J. Shaw), G. Simpson.

Match 4

Glasgow Caledonians: R Shepherd; D Stark, C Simmers (I Jardine 74 mins), A Collins, J Craig; T Hayes, F Stott; T Smith, K McKenzie, W Anderson (A Kittle 68 mins), S Grimes, G Perrett, J White, J Shaw (G Mackay 72 mins) G Simpson (M Waite 72 mins).

Connacht: W Ruane; R Southam (A Reddan 52 mins), P Duignan, M Murphy, N Carolan; O Cobbe (S Allnutt 40 mins), C McGuinness (D Reddan 32 mins); J Maher, J McVeigh, M Finlay (J Screene 59 mins), G Heaslip, J Duffy, J Casserley, S McEntee (N Culleton 6 mins), I Dillon.

Match 5

Glasgow Caledonians: T Hayes; J Craig, I Jardine, J Leslie, D Stark; L Smith, D Patterson; G McIlwham, K McKenzie, A Kittle, S Campbell, G Perrett, J White, J Shaw, G Mackay.Replacements - A Bulloch (used), C Simmers, C Little, M Wallace, G Flockhart (used), J Manson, G Scott (used)

South Africa: G du Toit; B Paulse, R Fleck, C Stewart, L Venter; B van Straaten, W Swanepoel; O le Roux, N Drotske, W Meyer, S Boome, J Trystman, C Krige, A Vos, B Skinstadt.Replacements - D Kayser (used), R Markram (used), C Alcock (used), P Smit, O Nkumane (used), T van der Linde (used)

Match 6

Glasgow Caledonians: T Hayes; J Craig, C Simmers (A Collins 66 min), I Jardine, A Bulloch; L Smith (C Paterson 76 min), C Little; G McIlwham, G Scott, A Kittle (J Manson 67 min), S Campbell, G Perrett, G Flockhart (J Petrie 5 min), J Shaw, G Mackay.

Māori All Blacks: A Cashmore; G Osborne, C Ralph, D Gibson (N Berryman 52 min), J Kerr; R MacDonald (B Reihana 71 min), R Duggan; G Feek (L Lidgard 40 min), J Akurangi (S McFarland 68 min), K Meeuws, J Coe, D Waller, H Makiri (R Ford 75 min), G Marsh, D Muir.

Match 7

Glasgow Caledonians: G Metcalfe; D Stark, A Collins, I Jardine, S Longstaff; L Smith (R Shepherd 69 mins), C Little; G McIlwham (J Manson 79 mins), G Scott, A Kittle (W Anderson 64 mins), S Campbell, G Perrett, R Wainwright, G Flockhart (M Waite 60 mins), G Mackay.

Fiji: W Tuisese; I Tikomaimakogai, V Satala, L Koroi (L Little 55 mins), F Lasagavibau; N Little, J Raulini (S Rabaka 59 mins); D Rouse, G Smith, M Taga (N Qoro 66 mins), I Tawake, S Raiwalui, A Naevo, K Sewabu, A Naituyaga.

European Champions Cup

The previous year's Scottish Inter-District Championship produced a tight finish and Glasgow were just pipped to first place by Caledonia Reds. The second place achieved in the Scottish Inter-District was enough for Glasgow to be entered in the Heineken Cup for the new season 1997–98.

The pool matches saw Glasgow grouped alongside London Wasps; with former player Kenny Logan now starring for the English side. Logan was to put Glasgow to the sword over the two matches, scoring 3 tries against his old team. Nevertheless, Glasgow did well enough to get out the group and snatch a quarter final play-off place. However they were soundly beaten by the Leicester Tigers and their matches against English opposition showed the gulf of professionalism that then existed between Scotland and England.

teams received in the pool matches: 
2 points for a win 
1 point for a draw

Pool 4

Results

Round 1

Round 2

Round 3

Round 4

Round 5

Round 6

Scottish Inter-District Championship

With the merging of the 4 districts into 2; now only Glasgow and Edinburgh were involved in a championship. Glasgow Caledonians and Edinburgh Reivers then fought it out in a renamed Tri-Series sponsored by Tennents Velvet.

Three matches were played between the clubs. Edinburgh won the series, beating Glasgow 2–1. A league table is shown for completeness. Both teams entered the next year's Heineken Cup.

1998-99 League Table

Results

Round 1

Round 2

Round 3

Welsh Rugby Union Challenge Cup

Both Glasgow Caledonians and Edinburgh Reivers were invited into the WRU's Challenge Cup; along with the South African provincial sides Northern Bulls and Gauteng Falcons and the Romania national side (in Glasgow's pool) and Natal, the Canada national side and the Georgia national side (in Edinburgh's pool).

The WRU constructed that year's tournament so that 8 Welsh teams are placed in two pools; 4 in each pool. The 4 Welsh sides in each pool then played the invited sides of that pool. The winners of each pool play a final; and the pool runners-up played a 3rd place play-off. Hence Glasgow (and Edinburgh and other invited sides) only played Welsh opposition in their pools.

Depending on results, the invited sides then would only play each other if they qualified out of their pools. Going into their last matches both Glasgow and Edinburgh had a chance to secure their pool runners up place. This would have meant a Glasgow - Edinburgh play-off in Wales! However Glasgow fell at the last hurdle. Although Edinburgh won their pool runners up spot they then pulled out of the 3rd place play-off against Bridgend due to their players' exhaustion.

Round 1

Round 2

Round 3

Round 4

Competitive debuts this season

A player's nationality shown is taken from the nationality at the highest honour for the national side obtained; or if never capped internationally their place of birth. Senior caps take precedence over junior caps or place of birth; junior caps take precedence over place of birth. A player's nationality at debut may be different from the nationality shown. Combination sides like the British and Irish Lions or Pacific Islanders are not national sides, or nationalities.

Players in BOLD font have been capped by their senior international XV side as nationality shown.

Players in Italic font have capped either by their international 7s side; or by the international XV 'A' side as nationality shown.

Players in normal font have not been capped at senior level.

A position in parentheses indicates that the player debuted as a substitute. A player may have made a prior debut for Glasgow Warriors in a non-competitive match, 'A' match or 7s match; these matches are not listed.

Tournaments where competitive debut made:

Crosshatching indicates a jointly hosted match.

Sponsorship

Official Kit Supplier

Canterbury

References

1998-99
1998–99 in Scottish rugby union
1998–99 Heineken Cup